Xenobolus acuticonus is a species of spirobolidan millipede. It was first described in 1936 by Carl Attems and is endemic to India.

References 

Spirobolida
Millipedes of Asia
Arthropods of India
Endemic fauna of India
Animals described in 1936